Edgar Alex Loyd (August 7, 1927 – May 1976) was an American football end in the National Football League for the San Francisco 49ers.  He played college football at Oklahoma State University and was drafted in the fifteenth round of the 1950 NFL Draft by the Washington Redskins.

1927 births
1976 deaths
People from Stigler, Oklahoma
American football tight ends
Oklahoma State Cowboys football players
San Francisco 49ers players